"Ave Cesaria" is a song by Belgian singer Stromae, the fifth single from his second album Racine carrée.

Charts

References

2013 songs
2014 singles
Songs written by Orelsan
Songs written by Stromae
Stromae songs
2014 songs